The Wulai Old Street is a street in Wulai District, New Taipei, Taiwan.

Architecture
The street is a shopping district located along Huanshan Road and Pubu Road. It is located at Atayal aboriginal village filled with many food stalls and restaurants. It stretches for 300 meters.

Tourist attractions
 Wulai Atayal Museum

See also
 List of roads in Taiwan
 List of tourist attractions in Taiwan

References

Streets in Taiwan
Transportation in New Taipei
Wulai District